The tenth season of the Dutch reality singing competition The Voice of Holland premiered on 8 November 2019 on RTL4. Host Martijn Krabbé,  as well as the four coaches from the previous season, Lil Kleine, Waylon, Ali B and Anouk all returned, while Wendy van Dijk left to move to SBS6 and was replaced by Chantal Janzen as a host with Krabbé, also Jamai Loman was replaced by Geraldine Kemper as a backstage host.

Sophia Kruithof won the competition from team Anouk and Anouk became the winning mentor for the second time.

Coaches and hosts 

In early 2019, Wendy van Dijk announced that she has moved from RTL 4 to SBS6 and therefore would not be able to return to the show as host. On 22 February 2019 it was announced Chantal Janzen will replace van Dijk as host for the tenth season. It has also been announced that Geraldine Kemper would replace Jamai Loman as backstage host. On 14 June 2019, it was announced via the show's broadcaster, RTL 4 and their Facebook page that Ali B, Waylon, Anouk and Lil' Kleine will all return for season 10.

Teams 
Color key

Blind auditions 

 Color key

Episode 1 (November 8)

Episode 2 (November 15)

Episode 3 (November 22)

Episode 4 (November 29)

Episode 5 (December 6)

Episode 6 (December 13)

Episode 7 (December 20)

The Battle Rounds

Color key:

The Knockouts
This season, guest coaches were invited to substitute for two coaches whose teams did not perform during the episode. Each episode featured two guest coaches who sat in the red chair along with two regular coaches whose teams performed. Episode 12, which featured performances from team Waylon and team Lil Kleine, brought back former coaches Marco Borsato and Sanne Hans in the places of Ali B and Anouk. In episode 13, team Ali B and team Anouk performed for their coaches and guest coaches Angela Groothuizen and Ronnie Flex.

Color key
 – Contestant was eliminated, either immediately (indicated by a "—" in the "Switched with" column) or switched with another contestant
 – Contestant was not switched out and advanced to the Live Shows

The Live Shows

Color key
 – Artist wasn't chosen by the public nor by his/her coach and was eliminated
 – Artist was voted through by public's vote
 – Artist was voted through by coach's vote

Week 1 & 2: Top 12 (February 7 & 14)
This season, the first round of the Live shows is team-based for the first time since the fifth season. Two teams would perform during each live show, with one artist saved by the public, one saved by their coach, and the remaining one eliminated. The first night covers the six artists from coaches Lil' Kleine and Anouk, while the second night features performances from team Ali B and Waylon.

Week 3: Crossbattles (February 21) 

With the eliminations of Danilo Kuiters and Kes van den Broek, Lil Kleine had no more acts left on his team to compete, making it the second season in a row that he had lost his team prior to the final, the first time being the ninth season. Also, Daphne Van Ditshuizen was the second stolen artist to have ever made it to the finals in the show's history, the first one being Samantha Steenwijk on the eight season. Also, both stolen artist originally came from Team Anouk.

Color key:

Week 4: Final (February 28)

Elimination Charts

Overall
Color key
Artist's info

Result details

Team
Color key
Artist's info

Result details

Artists' appearances in other media
 Anne Wilson participated in The voice of Holland season 1 as a member of team Jeroen (with the name Anne Schellekens) and The voice of Holland season 4 as a member of team Ali B. She was eliminated in the Battle rounds. Next to that, she participated in Holland's got talent season 1.
 Robin Buijs participated in The voice Kids season 4 as a member of team Borsato, she became runner-up.
 Meike Ubbink participated in The voice Kids season 4 as a member of team Angela, she was eliminated in the Battle rounds.
 Stan van Hoof participated in The voice Kids season 4 as a member of team Borsato, he was eliminated in the Battle rounds.
 Ayoub Maach participated in The voice Kids season 3 as a member of team Borsato, he was the winner of that season.
April Darby participated in the musical 'The Bodyguard'. She was the alternate Rachel Marron.
 Danilo Kuiters participated in The voice of Holland season 7, but no one turned for him during his blind audition.
 Mitch Lodewick participated in the Dutch Idols season 5, he didn't make it to the liveshows. He participated again in the Dutch Idols season 6 and he placed third.
 Ziggy Krassenberg participated in the Dutch Idols season 6, where he did not make it to the liveshows.
 Esmée Smit participated in the Dutch program Topper Gezocht, which she won and got a performance with De Toppers.
 Jasmijn Hendriks participated in the first season of the Dutch version of All Together Now, where she did not end on one of the three chairs.
 Lady Shaynah participated in the first season of the Dutch version of All Together Now, where she became second in her episode.
 Alisha Ramcharan participated in The voice of Holland season 6, but no one turned for her during her blind audition. Next to that, she participated in the first season of the Dutch version of All Together Now, where she became second in her episode.
 Rick Lips participated in the first season of the Dutch programme 'The Talent Project', where he became third.
 Céline Dib participated in The voice Kids season 2 as a part of team Borsato, where she was eliminated in the Battle rounds. She also participated in Holland's got talent season 9, as a duo with her father. Despite their golden buzzer, they were eliminated in the liveshows.
 Thysa de Bruijn participated in the Dutch Idols season 5, where she did not make it to the liveshows.
 Jeremy Garcia participated in the first season of the Dutch version of All Together Now, where he did not end on stage.
 Nigel Sean was one of the 100 judges in the first season of the Dutch version of All Together Now.
 Richy Brown participated in the Dutch X Factor season 1, where he became second.
 Roy van den Akker and Richy Brown were both part of the group LA: The Voices.
 in 2014, Stef Classens won the third season of De beste singer-songwriter van Nederland
 C.J.'s real name is Jordan Lee McGuire, a registered sex offender in the United States

Ratings

References

The Voice of Holland
2019 Dutch television seasons